Ponti is a comune (municipality) in the Province of Alessandria in the Italian region Piedmont, located about  southeast of Turin and about  southwest of Alessandria.

Ponti borders the following municipalities: Bistagno, Castelletto d'Erro, Denice, Monastero Bormida, Montechiaro d'Acqui, and Sessame.

References

Cities and towns in Piedmont